Frankie Duarte (born September 3, 1954, in Santa Monica, California) was an American boxer at Super Bantamweight.

Professional career 
Frankie Duarte turned pro in 1973 and retired in 1989 after losing to Daniel Zaragoza in a WBC super bantamweight title challenge. He finished his career with a record of 47-8-1.

References

External links 
 

1954 births
Living people
Boxers from California
Sportspeople from Santa Monica, California
American male boxers